The Battle of Al-Adabiya Port took place during the Yom Kippur War, on the west bank of the Suez Canal, in Egypt. It pitted the units of the 8th Algerian Armored Brigade led by Lieutenant Abdelmalek Guenaizia against a 1st Armored Brigade and 1st Infantry Battalion of the Israeli Army led by General Kalman Magen. The Battle of Al-Adabiya Port is one of the last battles of the Yom Kippur War, it comes after the Battle of Al-Adabiya and takes place after the ceasefire of October 24, 1973.

Background 
Following the Operation Badr, and therefore at the beginning of the Yom Kippur War, the Algerian President Houari Boumediene announced the dispatch of the 8th Brigade Algerian armored force composed of 3,000 men, 128 tanks (T-54 and T-55), 670 various vehicles, 12 artillery pieces and 16 anti-aircraft pieces, accompanied by 80 planes (i.e. the entire air force aeronautical fleet Algerian at that time) which had already been engaged in the conflict since October 7 in the theater of operations. On the evening of October 24 to 25, theoretically the last day of the war, the units of the 8th Armored Brigade finally arrived in the theater of operations, they will be directly integrated into the 4th Egyptian Armored Division of the 3rd Egyptian Field Army and will cover a 30 km defensive system including the port of Al-Adabiya.

Prelude to Battle 
General Avraham Adan and General Kalmar Magen had coordinated on the offensive in the Suez sector, General Adan was to take or totally isolate the city of Suez, at the same time, to give depth to the encirclement , Magen was to continue on the right of Adan, and was to take the southwestern sector of the outskirts of Suez. The approximately 10,000 men under the command of General Kalman Magen then moved towards the southwest of the outskirts of the city of Suez and more precisely in the city of Adabiya, the aim being to completely encircle the 3rd Egyptian field army. of the 2nd Egyptian Field Army, the village of Al-Adabiya had a highly strategic importance, indeed if the village was taken then the encirclement of the 3rd Egyptian Field Army would thus be terminated. Thus the battle of Al-Adabiya began, the Egyptian units were defeated and the city was taken almost completely, the 3rd Egyptian army was surrounded, but the port of Al-Adabiya protected by the 8th Algerian Armored Brigade still constituted the last position still defended in the city.

Battle Progress 
The battle began on the morning of October 25, the units of the 8th Armored Brigade were positioned about six hundred meters from the Israeli units led by General Magen. The Israeli units attacked the port of Al-Adabiya, then protected by Algerian units of the 8th Armored Brigade. The battle was very intense, it was particularly heavy in terms of losses on the Israeli side. The battle ended in a victory on the Algerian tactical and strategic level; General Magen's division failed to take the port of Al-Adabiya and finally accepted the ceasefire in the area of Suez on October 28.

Notes and References

Sources 
1) https://www.jeuneafrique.com/2) https://www.amazon.com/3) https://www.amazon.fr/4)
https://archive.org//

Battles of the Yom Kippur War
Conflicts in 1973